The House of Homberg (also spelled Honberg, historically  Hochinberc, Hochenberg; also Thierstein, Tierstein) was a noble family of medieval Switzerland; they had the title of count from late 11th to early 16th century. They ruled over much of what is now northwestern Switzerland, including parts of the cantons of Aargau, Berne, Solothurn and Basel-Country.

The first count of Thierstein (alternatively, of Homberg) was Rudolf de Dierstein, mentioned 1082. The two names are taken from two castles in Rudolf's possession, both located near Frick, Aargau. The Thierstein and Homberg lines separated in 1149. The Homberg line was extinct in 1223 with the death of Werner III and their territories were acquired by marriage Hermann IV of the House of Frohburg, whose line is also known as Frohburg-Homberg. Hermann's son Friedrich took the title of count of Homberg and built the castle Neu-Homberg in what is now part of the canton of Basel-Country. One of Friedrich's sons was Wernher von Homberg, one of the minnesingers featured in Codex Manesse.

The ancestral castles of Thierstein and Homberg were both destroyed in the earthquake of 1356, and the Thierstein branch of the family now renamed a castle of theirs near Büsserach (in what is now known as the Thierstein District of the canton of Solothurn) to Neu-Thierstein. In 1330, a branch of the Thierstein family, known as Thierstein-Farnsburg, built Farnsburg castle near Ormalingen. They were given Sisgau as a fief from the bishop of Basel. Count Oswald von Thierstein in 1479 received Hohkönigsburg in the Alsace as fief from  emperor Frederick III. The Thierstein family was extinct in 1517, after which Hohkönigsburg fell back to the House of Habsburg.

Counts of Thierstein and Homberg

House of Thierstein

See also
 House of Frohburg

References

Bibliography
 
 
 

Swiss nobility
Medieval Switzerland